The Wizard of the Nile was a burlesque operetta in three acts, composed by Victor Herbert to a libretto by Harry B. Smith.

Herbert's second operetta after Prince Ananias, The Wizard of the Nile was his first real success.  It was given 105 performances on Broadway at the Casino Theatre, opening on November 4, 1895, starring the comedian Frank Daniels (and his Comic Opera Company), and enjoyed productions in Britain and on the European continent – a rare achievement for an American work of the period – as well as a revival in New York.  None of Herbert's later shows would achieve as much international success.

Daniels played Kibosh, the Persian Magician.  His phrase, "Am I a wiz?" became a popular expression.  Edwin Isham also starred.  Famous songs include the waltz "Star Light, Star Bright", "My Angeline" and "In Dreamland".  A recording of this piece is available here.

Roles and original cast
Kibosh, a Persian magician, making a professional tour of Egypt – Frank Daniels
Abydos, his apprentice – Louise Royce
Ptolemy, King of Egypt – Walter Allen
Simoona, Ptolemy's second wife – Mary Palmer
Cleopatra, a Princess who knows naught of love – Dorothy Morton
Ptarmigan, Cleopatra's music teacher – Edwin Isham
Cheops, the royal weather bureau – Louis Casavant
Obeliska, captain of the Amazons – Helen Redmond
Netocris, lieutenant of the Amazons – Claudia Carlstedt
Merza, first maid-of-honor to Cleopatra – Grace Rutter

Musical numbers
Overture
Act I  –   Public Square in Alexandria.
No. 1 Ensemble – "Aïah!  Aïah!  Aïah!  Aïah!  Father Nile, keep us in thy care"
No. 2 Obeliska and Cheops, with Chorus – "He's not egotistic, but most optimistic"
No. 3 Oriental March – "Strew the way with flow'rets blooming"
No. 4 Ptolemy, Simoona and Chorus – "I am the ruler of the whole Egyptian nation"
No. 5 Kibosh and Chorus – "Of all the magicians of lofty positions who give exhibitions, I'm easily King."
No. 6a Chorus – "Pure and white is the Lotos Lily flower, tira la!"
No. 6b Chorus and Cleopatra – "I have been a-maying, though the month is June"
No. 7 Kibosh and Cleopatra – "Tell me, tell me prithee tell me"
No. 8 Ptarmigan – "If it were for me to lead to glory"
No. 9 Finale Act I – "Strew the way with flow'rets blooming, deck the paths with garlands gay."
 
Act II   –   Terraced roof of the King's palace.
No. 10 Serenade, with Abydos and Cheops – "List to our matin serenade, Princess, Princess fair"
No. 10a Scene – (in which Kibosh is pursued by an alligator, which eventually retreats in disgust)
No. 11 Ptarmigan and Cleopatra – "If I were a King, I would kneel, sweetheart, to thee"
No. 12 Cleopatra, Abydos, Simoona, Ptolemy and Cheops – "On Cleopatra's wedding day"
No. 13 Kibosh and Chorus – "She kept her secret well"
No. 14 Finale Act II – "Oh agony, unutterable woe!"

Act III  –   Interior of the King's private pyramid.
No. 15 Introduction and Stonecutters' Song, Ptarmigan and Male Chorus – "Work away, work away with a song, my boys."
No. 16 Cleopatra – "I seem to have known you my whole life long"
No. 16a Entrance of Kibosh, Simoona, Ptolemy and Cheops
No. 17 Waltz Quintette: Abydos, Simoona, Kibosh, Cheops and Ptolemy – "When sitting alone at eventide"
No. 18 Pages' Chorus – "To the pyramid softly stealing now we come"
No. 19 Echo Duet – Kibosh, Ptolemy and Pages - "In our bravery we're peerless"
No. 20 Finale Act III – "Ah! love we know"

Notes

References 
Information about Victor Herbert shows
Information about Herbert shows
Links to midi files and cast information

English-language operettas
Broadway musicals
1895 musicals
1895 operas
Operas
Operas by Victor Herbert